Ron E. Scott (born December 7, 1967) is a Canadian-Metis showrunner and director.  He is the founder of Prairie Dog Film + Television, an independent production company involved in creating scripted series. Company projects have been nominated for over 140 awards, including Best Dramatic Series and Best Dramatic Writing at the Canadian Screen Awards.

Scott is best known for Blackstone, Mixed Blessings and the one-hour procedural dramatic series Tribal.

Early life 
Scott was born to a Metis-Cree family in Edmonton, Alberta. Drawing from his childhood background, Scott grew up in a dysfunctional, part-native, part-white world that influenced his work. He found storytelling and cinema as an outlet: "The language of cinema from an early age and my challenging childhood helped me speak into different aspects", and "My childhood and earlier adult years were filled with stories and experiences that prepared me."

He graduated from Vancouver Film School in 1993.

Career 
Scott founded Prairie Dog Film + Television. In 1995, Scott's first feature film, Rubber Man, aired at the Cannes Film Market, Europe Cable and Superchannel.

Cowboy Country, a lifestyle television series, credited Scott as producer, director and writer. It celebrates century and heritage ranches, educating the public about famous and legendary characters of the west, and investigating their cuisine and craftsmanship. Cowboy Country's four seasons  were 91 half-hour episodes broadcast on APTN HD, CHUM, ACCESS, CLT and BookTelevision.

Scott produced, directed and wrote lifestyle television series My Green House, which consisted of 13 half-hour episodes broadcast on CHUM, ACCESS, CLT, and BookTelevision.

In 2007 Scott entered the half-hour dramatic comedy genre with Mixed Blessings - The Series, as executive producer and director. Mixed Blessings aired for three seasons on APTN with a total of 26 episodes.

In 2009, Scott released the one-hour tragic series Blackstone, an exploration of community, power, and politics on a First Nation reserve. Scott served as the creator, showrunner, and director during its five-season run.

In 2019, Scott started production as the showrunner on a new one-hour dramatic series, Tribal. The show premiered on APTN on Thursday, February 20, 2020. As of February 2020 the show was officially confirmed for a second season.

Filmography

Film

Television

Awards 
Scott has also won multiple awards for his directing and screenwriting, including a Gemini for his art direction for main title design, multiple AMPIA awards and the prestigious Queen's Diamond Jubilee Medal for his contributions to the Canadian Arts scene.

Accolades

References

External links

Ron E. Scott on Prairie Dog Film + Television

1967 births
Living people
Film producers from Alberta
Canadian Métis people
Canadian television directors
Canadian television producers
Canadian television writers
Film directors from Edmonton
Writers from Edmonton